Kalasadan is a performing arts college in Mumbai, India. It was founded in 1954 by Guru Shri Mani, and currently headed by his children and grandchildren.

References

External links
Kalasadan.com - Official Website

Cultural organisations based in India